Anthene lyzanius, the black-patches, is a butterfly in the family Lycaenidae. It is found in Sierra Leone, Liberia, Ivory Coast, Ghana, Nigeria (south and the Cross River loop), Cameroon, Gabon, the Republic of the Congo and northern Angola.

The larvae have been found on the young shoots of an unidentified plant. They are associated with the ant species Pheidole rotundata.

References

Butterflies described in 1874
Anthene
Butterflies of Africa
Taxa named by William Chapman Hewitson